North East Adventist University is a Seventh-day Adventist institution of higher learning near Jowai, India. The Higher Secondary is affiliated to Meghalaya Board of School Education (MBOSE). It is a part of the Seventh-day Adventist education system, the world's second largest Christian school system.
This institution was affiliated to the North Eastern Hill University (NEHU) from 1999 till 2019. It was upgraded to University on 29 April 2019 under the Northeast Adventist University Act, 2015.

History
North East Adventist University was established by Pr. O.W Lange in 1941 at the present location. It was then called the Assam Training School. It was inaugurated in 1942 by Sir Robert Reid, the Governor of Assam. When Meghalaya attained statehood in 1972, the name was changed to Adventist Training School (ATS). It served the people of East India and Northeast for many years as a Secondary School until it got upgraded to a Higher Secondary School in 1997, recognized by the Meghalaya Board of School Education (MBOSE).

Campus

The university is located on the pine-wooded  hills of Khliehtyrshi at Thadlaskein,  from Jowai town, Meghalaya, India. The NH 44 passes just in front of the Main gate.

Degree Courses 
The university offers education in the Arts and Humanities, Science, Health, Allied Science and Management & Commerce streams in the University. 
The campus also boost of Arts, Commerce and Science Streams in the Higher Secondary section.

Arts
Department of English
Department of History
Department of Sociology
Department of Political Science
Department of Education

Department of Health and Sciences
Department of Allied Science

See also

 List of Seventh-day Adventist colleges and universities
 Seventh-day Adventist education
 Seventh-day Adventist Church
 Seventh-day Adventist theology
 History of the Seventh-day Adventist Church

References

External links

Adventist universities and colleges in India
Universities and colleges affiliated with the Seventh-day Adventist Church
Universities and colleges in Meghalaya
Colleges affiliated to North-Eastern Hill University
1941 establishments in India
Educational institutions established in 1941